The Feller Bach is a right tributary of the Moselle in Rhineland-Palatinate (Germany). Its source is in the Hunsrück mountains. It flows through the villages Lorscheid (Verbandsgemeinde Ruwer), Fell and Riol (Verbandsgemeinde Schweich). It joins the Moselle in Riol.

At the left there is the Thommer Bach in the Nossernvalley with the Fell Exhibition Slate Mine (Besucherbergwerk Fell).

Rivers of Rhineland-Palatinate
Rivers of the Hunsrück
Rivers of Germany